David Cortright is an American scholar and peace activist.  He is Director of Policy Studies at the Kroc Institute for International Peace Studies at the University of Notre Dame and chair of the Board of the Fourth Freedom Forum. Cortright has a long history of public advocacy for disarmament and the prevention of war.

Biography 
Cortright is a 1968 graduate of the University of Notre Dame. In 1970 he received his M.A. from New York University, and completed his doctoral studies in 1975 at the Union Institute in residence at the Institute for Policy Studies in Washington, D.C.

As a soldier during the Vietnam War, Cortright joined with fellow soldiers to speak out against the war as part of the GI peace movement.

In 1977, Cortright was named the executive director of The Committee for a SANE Nuclear Policy (SANE), which under his direction became the largest disarmament organization in the U.S. Cortright initiated the 1987 merger of SANE and the Nuclear Weapons Freeze Campaign and served for a time as co-director of the merged organization. In 2002 Cortright helped to found the Win Without War coalition in opposition to the U.S. invasion of Iraq.

Starting in 2014, he fought to have the Department of Defense change a "rose-colored portrayal" of the Vietnam War on the government agency's website. Following the 2016 Colombian peace agreement referendum, he worked on the implementation of the 300-page agreement.

Work 
Cortright has written widely on nonviolent social change, nuclear disarmament, and the use of multilateral sanctions and incentives as tools of international diplomacy. He has provided research services to several foreign ministries, including those of Canada, Sweden, Switzerland, Japan, Germany, Denmark, and The Netherlands, and has advised agencies of the United Nations, the Carnegie Commission on Preventing Deadly Conflict, the International Peace Academy, and the John D. and Catherine T. MacArthur Foundation.

Books 
He is the author or co-editor of 19 books:
 Waging Peace in Vietnam: U.S. Soldiers and Veterans Who Opposed the War (New Village Press, 2019)
 Ending Obama's War: Responsible Military Withdrawal from Afghanistan (Paradigm, 2011)
 Towards Nuclear Zero, with Raimo Väyrynen (Routledge, 2010)
 Gandhi and Beyond: Nonviolence for a New Political Age 2nd ed. (Paradigm, 2009)
 Peace: A History of Movements and Ideas (Cambridge University Press, 2008)
 Uniting Against Terror: Cooperative Nonmilitary Responses to the Global Terrorist Threat (MIT Press, 2007), co-edited with George A. Lopez.

Over the past fifteen years, he and Lopez have written or co-edited a series of major works on multilateral sanctions, including:
 Smart Sanctions: Targeting Economic Statecraft (Rowman & Littlefield, 2002)
 Sanctions and the Search for Security: Challenges to UN Actions (Lynne Rienner Publishers, 2002)
 The Price of Peace: Incentives and International Conflict Prevention (Rowman & Littlefield Publishers, 1997)
 The Sanctions Decade: Assessing UN Strategies in the 1990s (Lynne Rienner Publishers 2000). Awarded the Publisher's Choice Outstanding Academic Title Award in 2001.

See also
 List of peace activists

References

External links 
 Official website

21st-century American male writers
American anti-war activists
American anti–Vietnam War activists
Nonviolence advocates
American anti–nuclear weapons activists
University of Notre Dame people
Living people
Year of birth missing (living people)
American male non-fiction writers